Kyle Gilmour (born January 26, 1988 in Fort McMurray, Alberta) is a Canadian rugby union flanker who plays for Rotherham and  Canada. Gilmour made his debut for Canada in 2013 and was part of the Canada squad at the 2015 Rugby World Cup.

References

External links

1988 births
Living people
Canada international rugby union players
Canadian rugby union players
People from Fort McMurray
Sportspeople from Alberta
Rugby union flankers